Isaac Daniel Hornsby (1 February 1900 – 18 May 1951) was an American singer songwriter, musician, recording artist, producer and arranger, studio engineer, band leader & band member. Discovered talent as A&R man with Columbia Records, and radio personality.

Before career

His father Joseph Todd Hornsby was a contractor and a part-time Baptist minister.

Dan Hornsby (Isaac Daniel) was born in Atlanta and later he was very proud of his first-born son, Joseph Thomas, who attended college  before enlisting in the military. Earlier at the age of 19 Dan worked as a painter with the W.E. Browne Decorating Co. in Columbus, Georgia when he met Louise Wise of Little Rock, Arkansas. She sang and danced in a road show, and they met at the hotel, which Hornsby was painting. They married and had five children. 
His oldest son, Joseph T., after college was a former US Marine pilot who married, Dorothea also a US Marine at Cherry Point Military Base in North Carolina. Joe then retired from military as a US Marine Corp Captain to work the rest of his life for the FAA Federal Aviation Administration US GS-15 step 10 Federal government service until retirement. They had children and a daughter Nikki Hornsby, who also became a full-time artist - singer, songwriter, musician, producer, arranger, and founder of CJP-NHRecords in 1980s.

Beginning of career
After the marriage Louise quit the stage, but Dan drifted towards show business although he did not have any formal musical training. However, he enjoyed playing trumpet, piano, and singing with various dance bands in Atlanta in the 1920s. Hornsby formed his basic group Dan Hornsby Quartet: Perry Bechtel (banjo, guitar and bariton), Taylor Flanagan (piano and high tenor), Sterling Melvin (guitar and bass guitar) and Dan Hornsby (lead singer and arranger).

The Atlanta Baking Company asked Hornsby to do a show on WSM Radio in Atlanta, Georgia. The group name was changed to Bamby Baker Boys and Hornsby became the first commercial performer of the WSB radio station, which started airing in 1922. His pleasant disposition and sense of humor earned him a nickname "Cheerful Dan" "the man with the two octave voice". Hornsby also recording his different octave voices under another name “Tom Dorsey” and he was “Uncle Ted” in a novelty popular recorded song of his era. 
Dan Hornsby also discovered a great deal of American musical talents like Bessie Smith and many others of that time for Columbia Records. He was a music engineer as well as producer of recorded music in Atlanta for Columbia Records being a popular singer, songwriter, and musician.

Main career
Hornsby's performance on radio was noticed by Columbia Records - the oldest record company. His main role was a sort of talent scout, but he had many roles at Columbia Records during the 1920s and early 1930s, including production of his own recordings like "On Mobile Bay" and "I Want A Girl" “Take Me Out To The Ballgame” or with Young Brothers Tennessee Band: "Are you from Dixie" and "Won't You Come Home Bill Bailey, Bill Bailey, won't you please come home", "Oh! Susanna", "Little Brown Jug", and other classic American songs including a few original folk songs he wrote & sang for Columbia. For example, Dan Hornsby was the first recorded voice of the "Arkansas Traveler" and was the producer of the first recording of "You Are My Sunshine". His vocal style was pop to Americana novelty.

Hornsby worked with Gid Tanner and his group Skillet Lickers. Hornsby appeared usually in the role of city slicker, judge or sheriff, and he used the nickname Tom Dorsey.

On 28 August 1928 a building collapsed in Shelby, North Carolina killing six people and injuring twice as many. Hornsby composed a song title Shelby Disaster:

During the Great Depression this Hornsby song sold over 9,000 copies of his original song for Columbia Records. Together with Clayton McMichen Hornsby also wrote History in a few words published in 1931 by Shapiro, Bernstein & Co.

In 1931 he recruited Alton and Rabon Delmore (later known as Delmore Brothers) for Columbia Records.

Changes
The Great Depression also affected the phonographic industry and Hornsby lost his job with Columbia Records despite selling over 9000 recordings of "The Shelby Disaster". He then went back to radio and worked with several stations including WGST, where his roles included announcer, continuity man and even a comic in programs like "Down to Unkle Zeke's".

For Bluebird Records, he sang with the big band of former Quartet guitarist Perry Bechtel, and he played Uncle Ned in a series of children's bedtime stories such as "Humpty Dumpty", "Wynken, Blynken, and Nod".

In 1939 he appeared in the first television broadcast in Atlanta. Later he joined RCA Victor Records and then moved to other stations like WATL and WCON.

In 1986 Dan Hornsby was included into the Atlanta Country Music Hall of Fame, joining the names of some of his friends and associates: Gid Tanner, Clayton McMichen and Riley Puckett.

In 2013 Dan Hornsby was given a display in the Grammy Museum in Los Angeles, CA, for the year-long Columbia Records 360 Sound event where his grand daughter, Nikki Hornsby, was invited for a private viewing with CJP-NHRecords staff.

Bands

During his career Hornsby both created or joined many music bands:
 Dan Hornsby Trio
 Dan Hornsby Novelty Quartet
 Dan Hornsby Novelty Orchestra
 Dan Hornsby & His Lion's Den Trio
 Skillet Lickers
 Young Brothers Tennessee Band
 Bamby Baker Boys
 Taylor Flanagan & His Trio
 Georgia Organ Grinders.

Discography

References

External links
 Dan Hornsby recordings at the Discography of American Historical Recordings.
 Artist Nikki Hornsby's grandfather Dan Hornsby the man with the two octave voice. Atlanta Music Hall of Fame 1986

 Artist Dan Hornsby display at Grammy Museum 2013 Columbia Records 360 Event
 Artist Dan Hornsby Musician who wrote song about 1928 Shelby Disaster recognized by Grammy Museum
 Dan Hornsby exhibit at Grammy Museum photo 7 360 Sound: The Columbia Records Story

1900 births
1951 deaths
People from Atlanta
Old-time musicians